Craig Waters was the public information officer and communications director for the Florida Supreme Court in Tallahassee from June 1, 1996, through February 28, 2022. He is widely recognized for his work in open government and First Amendment rights, both as a lawyer and as a governmental official. He is best known as the public spokesman for the Court during the 2000 presidential election controversy, when he frequently appeared on worldwide newscasts announcing rulings in lawsuits over Florida's decisive vote in the election.

These cases are known to history as George W. Bush v. Albert Gore Jr. or Bush v. Gore. Waters' role in these events has been reprised in films, documentaries, and books about Florida's botched 2000 general election, which forced the world to wait for more than a month to learn who would become the next President of the United States of America.

Career at the Florida Supreme Court
Waters began work at the Florida Supreme Court on March 2, 1987 as a law clerk (staff attorney). In the early 1990s, Waters was instrumental both in creating and  greatly expanding the Florida Supreme Court's website at a time when the World-Wide Web was new and barely understood. Under the administration of Chief Justice Gerald Kogan, Waters led the Florida Supreme Court's efforts to begin webcasting video of all of its oral arguments when the technology to do so first became available.

Simultaneously, the Court began broadcasting via satellite and over the cable network the Florida Channel as part of the same program. Broadcasts continue to the present day. In the early 2000s, Waters made the Florida Supreme Court a pioneer in the use of emerging social media such as Facebook, Twitter, Instagram, and LinkedIn to communicate with the public. This work was deeply influenced by Waters' prior career as a Florida journalist.

Starting in 2015, Waters began spearheading Chief Justice Jorge Labarga's plans, approved by the entire Florida Supreme Court, to implement a statewide communications plan for the state courts. The plan relies heavily on the use of public information officers or PIOs at all 27 divisions of the Florida State Courts and calls for increasing use of social media and other new technology like smartphones. The plan is being implemented through an organization Waters founded a decade earlier, the Florida Court Public Information Officers, Inc., a federally recognized 501(c)(3) nonprofit formed as a professional association. Waters retired after 35 years on February 28, 2022.

Portrayal in film
Waters is portrayed in the HBO Movie Recount by the actor Alex Staggs. The film, which had a broadcast premiere of May 25, 2008, and initially was produced by Sydney Pollack, chronicled the events in Florida during the presidential election lawsuits and appeals. For more than a month following the November 7, 2000, election, Florida's vote for the presidency remained undecided and too close to call, with the outcome hinging on legal decisions from the Florida Supreme Court that were announced by Waters on live worldwide television.

Staggs reenacts two scenes in which Waters announced the result of Florida Supreme Court decisions. The actual announcements had been unprecedented and were carried live by major television networks in the United States and around the globe. No American court previously had made live public announcements about legal decisions with such a major impact on world history. It was the first time many people had witnessed any appellate court doing its work from start to finish.

The first decision occurred on November 21, 2000, when Waters announced a court ruling extending the vote-counting deadline previously set by Florida Secretary of State Katherine Harris. The second was on December 8, 2000, when Waters announced a decision requiring a statewide recount of ballots. The United States Supreme Court overruled this last decision on December 12, 2000, in an opinion that effectively handed the presidency to George W. Bush.

Waters later told a newspaper reporter: "My role as Court spokesman back then is something great to have in your past, once it proves to be a success. But I can tell you that the success was by no means guaranteed at the time.  I came to work every day for more than a month in the fall of 2000 knowing there were a thousand ways to fail and millions of people watching."

Election 2000 in reality and in film

Writings and scholarship
A prolific writer and scholar, Waters' works include "Waters' Dictionary of Florida Law" published by London-based Butterworths, a three-volume treatise "AIDS and Florida Law" also published by Butterworths, and several dozen scholarly articles on various subjects generally related to civil rights, AIDS and disability law, court emergency preparedness, and the use of technology to improve court and media relations. He is coauthor of a comprehensive article on Florida Supreme Court protocol and jurisdiction.

In the fall of 2008, Waters published a detailed article in the Journal of Appellate Practice & Process on the novel techniques he used to coordinate media relations at the Florida Supreme Court during the 2000 election cases.  The article is titled "Technological Transparency: Appellate Court & Media Relations after Bush v. Gore." It chronicled the emerging use both of public spokespersons and high-technology communication increasingly employed by courts worldwide in the 21st Century.

Work in court and media relations
In 1997, Waters spearheaded a project  that put all Florida Supreme Court arguments on live television, cable, satellite, and web broadcasts. He also was responsible for a pioneering effort started in 1994 to place all documents in high-profile court cases on the Web for instant public access, which has been widely praised in the media. The media also credited Waters' work in 2000 with putting pressure on federal courts to provide the public greater technological access to their own proceedings. 

Prior to attending law school, Waters was a reporter for the Gannett Company in the Tallahassee capital press corps, covering state government and the state Supreme Court he eventually would work for.  His experience as a statehouse journalist greatly influenced his approach to court and media relations.  Prior to Waters becoming the court public information officer in 1996, the Florida Supreme Court routinely avoided contact with media and was widely seen as secretive.

Waters brought an end to that approach, first by putting large amounts of public information on the Florida Supreme Court website he maintained. In September 1997 in cooperation with Florida State University, Waters launched the first comprehensive program to broadcast all court arguments live on television, via satellite, on cable systems, and in webcasts.  That program, now called Gavel to Gavel. remains in place today and has been widely imitated.

Earlier legal work
Before becoming the Florida Supreme Court's first public information officer in 1996, Waters served for nine years as a staff attorney.  He worked in this capacity for nearly three years with Florida's first woman Justice, Rosemary Barkett from West Palm Beach.  The remaining time was spent advising Justice Gerald Kogan from Miami until, upon becoming Chief Justice in 1996, Kogan moved Waters permanently into court administration and his current job.

Before law school, Waters worked for four years as a reporter with the Florida Gannett newspapers, from 1979 to 1983.  He won a number of awards.  These included recognition for work exposing racist campaign practices in the 1980 Pensacola city elections, for articles dealing with the then-novel concept of chronic spouse abuse syndrome as a defense to criminal charges, and for a series of articles at the height of the 1980s Reagan arms build-up about Florida's profound failures in emergency preparedness.

These last articles presaged Waters' later work in emergency preparedness with the Florida State Courts system following the terrorist attacks of September 11, 2001, the anthrax attacks of 2001, and the disastrous Florida hurricane seasons of 2004 and 2005. One of his lasting contributions was the founding of the Florida Court Public Information Officers, Inc., a federally recognized nonprofit organized for educational purposes. FCPIO serves as a network of Florida's court PIOs with members in all 26 subdivisions of the state courts system, with regular meetings around Florida.

Speeches and educational lectures
Waters has given many speeches on issues he has explored in his professional life, including one on at the 10th international Court Technology Conference organized in 2007 by the National Center for State Courts.  He is coauthor of a professional paper describing how state and federal disability laws will require rethinking current practices in creating and maintaining court websites.

He previously spoke on the technology of disasters, dealing with court emergency preparedness following the September 11, 2001, terrorists attacks and the extensive hurricane seasons of 2004 and 2005. Since 2000, Waters has given dozens of speeches nationwide on the media relations techniques he pioneered in the 1990s and how they were especially useful during the Bush v. Gore presidential election appeals, when he employed cutting-edge technology to give people real-time access to documents and broadcasts on a worldwide basis.

In early 2014, he spoke at Stetson University College of Law in St. Petersburg, Florida, as part of its Institute for the Advancement of Legal Communications.  At that time, he met with faculty and students to survey the growing role of high-tech communications in informing the public about the role of courts and lawyers in our society.  He drew heavily on his experiences with Bush v. Gore and examined how the communications challenges of that earlier constitutional crisis might have played out using the technology available in 2014.

Other activities
He is founding president of the Florida Court Public Information Officers, Inc., a federally recognized tax exempt organization.  He has been heavily involved in activities of The Florida Bar, including serving on the editorial board of the Florida Bar Journal and the Florida Bar News. He also serves on the Florida Bar Media & Communications Law Committee and has chaired and hosted many of its ongoing programs of outreach to media. These include the annual Florida Bar Reporters Workshop held each fall at the Florida Supreme Court Building, a program for training journalists in reporting on the courts and the law.  A native of Pensacola, Florida, he has been a member in good standing of the Florida Bar since May 1987.

Education
Waters attended Brown University in Providence, Rhode Island as an undergraduate, receiving his degree with honors in 1979. Previously, he took classes at Pensacola State College, then known as Pensacola Junior College. He received his Juris Doctor with honors from the University of Florida College of Law (now the Levin College of Law) in 1986.

Before law school, he worked for four years as a journalist with the Gannett newspapers in Pensacola and Tallahassee. Half of his time as a reporter was spent covering the court beat in Pensacola, where his interest in attending law school first developed. Before college, Waters attended public schools in Pensacola, graduating from J. M. Tate High School. At an early age, Waters was placed on an advanced educational track because of high test scores in the Escambia County, Florida, school system.  He remained on this track until graduation from high school.

References

1956 births
Living people
Brown University alumni
People from Tallahassee, Florida
People from Pensacola, Florida
Florida lawyers
Pensacola Junior College alumni
Fredric G. Levin College of Law alumni